The Current Mayor of Perth Amboy is Helmin Caba, who was elected on December 15, 2020 after defeating Wilda Diaz and was sworn in on January 1, 2021. Perth Amboy, New Jersey is governed under the Mayor-Council system of municipal government under the Faulkner Act. Members of the City Council are elected at-large on a non-partisan basis to four-year terms of office on a staggered basis, with two or three seats coming up for election in even years. The mayor also serves a four-year term of office, which is up for election the same year that two council seats are up for vote. In October 2010, the City Council voted to shift the city's non-partisan elections from May to November, with the first balloting held in conjunction with the General Election in November 2012. Terms run from January 1  to December 31. A royal charter was issued on August 4, 1718. Perth Amboy was incorporated	as a city on December 21, 1784.

Mayors

The mayors are:

References

 
Perth Amboy